Kristen Vigard (born May 15, 1963) is an American actress and singer. She is known for being the first actress to play the title role in Annie in its pre-Broadway run and for her two-year run as Morgan Richards on Guiding Light (1980–81). She also had a two-year run on One Life to Live (1984–85).

Vigard has appeared in two feature films, The Black Stallion (1979) and The Survivors (1983). Additionally she had roles in two TV movies, Home to Stay (1978) and License to Kill (1984), and also had guest appearances on three TV series.

Kristen Vigard released her eponymous debut album in 1988. She recorded and toured as a backup singer with the Red Hot Chili Peppers and Fishbone in the late 1980s and early 1990s, appearing on RHCP's Mother's Milk (1989) and One Hot Minute (1995) and Fishbone's The Reality of My Surroundings (1991) and Give a Monkey a Brain (1993).

Vigard sang the lead vocals for Illeana Douglas for the 1996 film Grace of My Heart, including "God Give Me Strength", which was nominated for Best Original Song at the 1st Golden Satellite Awards.

She released her second album, God, Loves and Angels in 2004. More recently, she was a founding member of the downtempo acoustic rock band New White Trash, which released three albums between 2011 and 2014.

Early life and education
Vigard was born on May 15, 1963, in St. Paul, Minnesota, the daughter of actress Mallory Millett Danaher and Ronald Vigard, who worked for 3M. In the late 1960s, she moved with her family to New York City where she made her acting debut at the age of 6. She was one of the first clients to be signed to the children's division of the Ford Modeling Agency, along with Brooke Shields and Ricky Schroder.

Vigard went to high school at Friends Seminary in Manhattan. She then studied classical orchestration and music listening at the Juilliard School of Music Extension Program.

Career

Musical theatre
Vigard's debut stage role was in 1970 when she worked with La MaMa Experimental Theatre Club, appearing in A Cheap Trick, playing a carrot in a production starring Holly Woodlawn, Candy Darling and Jackie Curtis. This was followed by a role in 100 Miles from Nowhere, and she appeared with Ruby Dee in The Wedding Band in 1972. Vigard continued performing in theatre, appearing in additional productions with Joanne Woodward and Shirley Knight.

In 1976, she created the title role in the musical Annie at the Goodspeed Opera House in East Haddam, Connecticut. However, the producers soon decided that Vigard's genuinely sweet interpretation was not tough enough for the street-smart character. After a week of performances, Vigard was replaced by Andrea McArdle, who played one of the orphans. Vigard later went on to become McArdle's Broadway understudy.

In 1977, Vigard played "Crissy" in the short-lived Broadway revival of Hair: The American Tribal Love-Rock Musical. Though the show met with mostly negative reviews, Vigard received some of the best notices.  The New York Times wrote, "The very best song of all, and perhaps the best performance as well, is Miss Vigard in the stony and touching saga of a teenybopper, 'Frank Mills.'  Miss Vigard looks like an ancient 12-year-old; she sings in a clear, clean style that cuts most satisfyingly through the general lushness."  Newsweek noted, "Angel-faced Kristen Vigard is the nicest of [the] cast."

In May 1979, she returned to Broadway as Johanne in Martin Charnin and Thomas Meehan's I Remember Mama with Liv Ullmann. Although the show was the last musical to be written by Richard Rodgers, it received mixed reviews.

Television and film
Vigard made her television debut alongside Henry Fonda in the 1978 TV movie Home to Stay. In 1980, Vigard was cast as Morgan Richards on the daytime soap opera Guiding Light. That same year, she appeared on the cover of People as one of the "Torrid Teens on the Soaps". She remained on the show for two years.

Vigard made her film debut in the 1979 film, The Black Stallion. In 1983, she appeared in her first major screen role alongside Robin Williams, playing Walter Matthau's daughter in The Survivors. Although the film itself was panned by critics, People magazine described Vigard's performance as "appealing."

She continued her work on television in a 1983 episode of Fame, a 1984 TV movie License to Kill, a two-year stint on One Life to Live as Joy O'Neill from 1984 to 1985, a 1986 episode of The Equalizer, and a 1987 episode of Amazing Stories.

Music
Vigard then pursued a music career, initially singing solo in Paris subway stations before joining the underground music scene in Los Angeles. In the late 1980s and early 1990s she recorded and toured as a backup singer with the Red Hot Chili Peppers and Fishbone, appearing on the former's Mother's Milk (1989) and One Hot Minute (1995) and Fishbone's The Reality of My Surroundings (1991) and Give a Monkey a Brain and He'll Swear He's the Center of the Universe (1993).

In 1988, she released her eponymous debut album on the Private Music label. It was chosen as one of the top 100 albums of the year by Playboy and reached the Billboard Top 30. Reviewer Tim Marklein of The Stanford Daily gave the album an "A+" and compared her to Paul Simon, writing that "Twenty-six year old Kristen Vigard may look young, but her debut album shows that she has as much experience merging different forms of music as Paul Simon."

In 1996, she sang the lead vocals for Illeana Douglas for the film Grace of My Heart. Vigard's second album, God, Loves and Angels, released in 2004, includes Vigard's performance of "God Give Me Strength", which was not included on the soundtrack CD.

New White Trash
From 2009 through 2013, Vigard was a member of the band New White Trash, a downtempo acoustic rock band. Vigard was a founding member, along with Michael C. Ruppert, drummer Andy Kravitz, and guitarist Doug Lewis. The band released two albums, Doublewide (2011) and Age of Authority (2013). Following Ruppert's suicide in 2014, the band announced its intention to release a tribute album. Beyond the Rubicon was released on December 11, 2014.

Personal life
Vigard lives with her husband and her daughter in Taos, New Mexico, where she has appeared in local plays.

In popular culture
Vigard's short-lived role as Annie is mentioned in the 2008 film Phoebe in Wonderland.

Selected discography

With Red Hot Chili Peppers

With Fishbone

With New White Trash

Music videos

Other credits

Notes

References

 in

External links
 
 
 
 
 
 
 Vigard on the cover of People, October 27, 1980
 Photographs of Vigard in I Remember Mama at Museum of the City of New York
 Photographs of Vigard at the New York Public Library Digital Collections

1963 births
Living people
20th-century American actors
20th-century American singers
21st-century American artists
Actresses from New York City
Actresses from Saint Paul, Minnesota
American child actresses
American child singers
American film actresses
American musical theatre actresses
American soap opera actresses
American television actresses
American women rock singers
American women singers
Artists from Taos, New Mexico
Friends Seminary alumni
Juilliard School alumni
Private Music artists
Singers from Minnesota
Singers from New Mexico
Singers from New York City